Wales is a village and a civil parish in the Metropolitan Borough of Rotherham in South Yorkshire, England. Historically part of the West Riding of Yorkshire, it borders to the south Derbyshire and is astride the M1 motorway. The civil parish of Wales, which has a population of 6,455, increasing to 7,069 at the 2011 Census, encompasses the village and neighbouring settlement Kiveton Park.

History
Wales shares its name with the country of Wales, and the derivation may well be the same if it bears the same Anglo Saxon (and Germanic) root meaning Romanised foreigner(s). A term used to refer to those in the western regions of the Roman Empire (see: Etymology of Wales). The suggestion, therefore, is that there was a continued Celtic presence here, that was distinctively Roman, following the arrival of the Anglo-Saxons at the turn of the 6th century. An alternative explanation suggests that the settlement's name may be derived from the word Waelas, meaning "field of battle". The earliest reference to Wales is in 1002, when Wulfric Spot, a Saxon thegn, is recorded as owning Walesho.

Sir William Hewet, Lord Mayor of London in 1559, was born in Wales, and his descendants, the Dukes of Leeds, would come to dominate the area.

The collieries at Waleswood and Kiveton Park historically provided employment in the area, including to migrants from Wales' namesake country, until Kiveton Park Colliery was closed in September 1994.

Waleswood 
Waleswood is a small hamlet located to the north-west of Wales. Historically the hamlet was known for Waleswood Hall, and later Waleswood Colliery, which also featured a railway station. Much of the former colliery site is now occupied by the Gulliver's Valley theme park.

Wales Bar 
Wales Bar is another hamlet, located to the west of Wales. The village contains typical 20th Century miners housing, with many of the former occupants working in the surrounding collieries at Waleswood and Brookhouse.

Geography
It lies on the A618 and B6059 roads. The M1 motorway bisects the parish, while the southern boundary is partly marked by the Chesterfield Canal whose Norwood Tunnel runs under meadowland to the south. To the west of the village is Rother Valley Country Park.

Education and employment
Education in Wales is provided by Wales Primary School and Wales High School.
The industrial estate at Wales Common continues to be a large source of employment (not least the food manufacturer Greencore Prepared Foods) & LuK, part of the multi-national manufacturing group producing clutch & automotive parts.

See also
Listed buildings in Wales, South Yorkshire

References

External links

 

Villages in South Yorkshire
Geography of the Metropolitan Borough of Rotherham
Civil parishes in South Yorkshire